Mfarakeh (also spelled mofarakah or mufaraqah also known as Batata Wa Bayd is an Arab dish made of potato, egg, ghee, cumin powder, salt and pepper, in addition chopped coriander leaf for garnish. This dish is very simple to make for breakfast, lunch or dinner. It is eaten with Arabic bread (Pita) and Arabic tea. 

Mfarakeh is traditionally served as part of a mezze in the Arab world, especially in Levant (Palestine, Lebanon, Syria, Jordan).

Etymology
The word "mfarakeh" is derived from the Arabic verb, meaning "the rubbed". The root is also used to describe the crumbling apart of fully ripe wheat when rubbed in one's hand or even a wooden whisk used to break up food. This renders the meaning closer to "that which is crumbled or broken apart into bits"; descriptive of the way the egg falls in crumbles around the potatoes.

Preparation
Cut the onions and put in a saucepan with olive oil on medium to light heat until well wilted. Then add the potatoes, peeled and cut into small cubes, season with salt, pepper and cumin, and add a quarter cup of boiled water. Cook on low heat until the potatoes are tender, but have not lost their shape. Whisked eggs are then poured over the potatoes and gently stirred until all the egg is cooked; garnishes like coriander leaves are spread about just before serving.

See also
Arab cuisine

References

Arab cuisine
Levantine cuisine
Syrian cuisine
Lebanese cuisine
Palestinian cuisine
Jordanian cuisine